George Frederick Mitchell (18 February 1897 – date of death unknown) was an English cricketer.  Mitchell was a left-handed batsman, though his bowling style is unknown.  He was born at Canning Town, Essex.

Mitchell made a single first-class appearance for Essex against Oxford University in 1926.  He took a single wicket in the match, that of George Newman.  He batted once, batting at number eleven he scored 4 runs before being dismissed by John Greenstock.

References

External links
George Mitchell at ESPNcricinfo
George Mitchell at CricketArchive

1897 births
People from Canning Town
Year of death missing
English cricketers
Essex cricketers